Sulkhan Singh (born 8 September 1957) is a retired Indian Police Service (IPS) officer belonging to Uttar Pradesh cadre. He was the Director General of Uttar Pradesh Police.

Education 
Singh has a graduate degree in Civil Engineering (BTech/B.E.) from IIT Roorkee (then University of Roorkee), a post graduate diploma in Structural Engineering from IIT Delhi. He also has a degree in Law (LLB).

Career
Sulkhan Singh has served in various key positions for Uttar Pradesh Government (Police), including as the Director General (DG) of Uttar Pradesh Police, Director General of Training Directorate, Additional Director General (ADG) (Police Headquarters) in Allahabad, Additional Director General/Inspector General/Secretary (ADG/IG) in Department of Prison administration and reform of Uttar Pradesh Government, Inspector General (IG) of Lucknow Zone, Deputy Inspector General of Lucknow, Allahabad and Mirzapur ranges, and as District Senior Senior Superintendent of Police/Superintendent of Police (SSP/SP) of Agra, Allahabad, Saharanpur, and Rampur districts.

Singh was given extension of three months in September 2017 to serve as Director General of Uttar Pradesh Police till December.

Singh retired on 31 December 2017.

Decorations

  Police Medal for meritorious service - Received on 15 August 1998
  President's Police Medal for distinguished service - Received on 15 August 2006
  50th Independence Anniversary Medal - Received on 15 August 1997
 Union Home Minister’s Medals for excellence in Police Training - Received on 8 September 2017

References

External links 
 Executive Record Sheet as maintained by Ministry of Home Affairs of Government of India

Director Generals of Uttar Pradesh Police
Indian Police Service officers
IIT Delhi alumni
IIT Roorkee alumni
People from Banda, Uttar Pradesh
1957 births
Living people